Schofield Barracks is a United States Army installation and census-designated place (CDP) located in the City and County of Honolulu and in the Wahiawa District of the Hawaiian island of Oahu, Hawaii.  Schofield Barracks lies adjacent to the town of Wahiawā, separated from most of it by Lake Wilson (also known as Wahiawā Reservoir).  Schofield Barracks is named after Lieutenant General John McAllister Schofield, who was the Commanding General of the United States Army from August 1888 to September 1895.  He had been sent to Hawaii in 1872 and had recommended the establishment of a naval base at Pearl Harbor.

The post was established in 1908 to provide mobile defense of Pearl Harbor and the entire island. It has been the home of the 25th Infantry Division, nicknamed the “Tropic Lightning” division, since 1941, as well as the headquarters for United States Army Hawaii (USARHAW). The population was 14,904 at the 2020 census.

Geography
Schofield Barracks is located at  (21.497650, −158.063248). The Main Gate used to be off Wilikina Drive; however, now only the Foote and Lyman gates located along Kunia Road are used for controlled access. Proceeding north on Wilikina Road (State Rte. 99) leads to intersections with Kaukonahua Road (State Rte. 801) to Waialua and Kamehameha Highway (State Rte. 99) to Haleiwa. East on Wilikina leads to Interstate H-2 and Kamehameha Highway (State Rte.s 80 and 99) to Wahiawā and Mililani Town. Proceeding south on Kunia Road (State Route 750) past Schofield leads to the Kunia Gate on Wheeler, Kunia, and eventually Waipahu.

According to the United States Census Bureau, the post has a total area of 2.8 square miles (7.1 km2), all of it land.

Demographics

As of the 2000 census, there were 14,428 people, 2,965 households, and 2,902 families residing in the CDP. The population density was 5,251.5 people per square mile (2,025.7/km2).  There were 3,733 housing units at an average density of 1,358.7 per square mile (524.1/km2). The racial makeup of the CDP was 56.4% White, 21.9% African American, 1.1% Native American, 3.9% Asian, 1.7% Pacific Islander, 8.6% from other races, and 6.5% from two or more races. Hispanic or Latino of any race were 16.2% of the population.

There were 2,965 households, out of which 78.0% had children under the age of 18 living with them, 91.5% were married couples living together, 4.8% had a female householder with no husband present, and 2.1% were non-families. 2.0% of all households were made up of individuals, and none had someone living alone who was 65 years of age or older.  The average household size was 3.55 and the average family size was 3.58.

In the CDP the population was spread out, with 32.1% under the age of 18, 29.8% from 18 to 24, 36.6% from 25 to 44, 1.4% from 45 to 64, and 0.1% who were 65 years of age or older.  The median age was 22 years. For every 100 females, there were 152.3 males.  For every 100 females age 18 and over, there were 183.6 males.

The median income for a household in the CDP was $33,788, and the median income for a family was $32,970. Males had a median income of $21,112 versus $18,737 for females. The per capita income for the CDP was $12,316.  About 6.7% of families and 7.2% of the population were below the poverty line, including 8.5% of those under age 18 and none of those age 65 or over.

Climate
Schofield Barracks has a tropical savanna climate. Owing to a higher elevation, Schofield is slightly cooler year round than Honolulu, but is still well within the realms of a tropical climate. Precipitation patterns closely resemble those of mediterranean climates being found in mainland California, but its warm winters prevents the climate from being classified as such.

Post areas

Main Post
The Main Post area consists of numerous quadrangle-style barracks and unit command structures, most of which have a letter designation.  B and C Quads are the oldest, having been constructed in the 1910s, with D, E, and F quads being built later.  Additionally on Main Post are the PX (post exchange), the Commissary, the "Aloha Building", the Library, Bowling Alley, and Uniform Clothing Store.  Several sets of barracks have recently been constructed (the first set completed in 1998) adhering to a more stylish apartment-type setup.  The Nehelani Club, Old Nehelani Club and Conroy Bowl are in the Main Post area as well.

Housing areas
Much of the housing on-post has been renovated or rebuilt now that the housing has been privatized.  The enlisted housing area lies to the west of Main Post, while the officers' housing lies to the north along Wilikina Drive. Island Palms is the on-post housing company, which is part of Lend Lease, that is responsible for maintaining the units. The average wait time for housing is 2–6 months and up to one year for larger homes.

Area X
Area X and its environs constitute the bulk of the training areas on Schofield Barracks.  Large open areas allow for air assault operations to take off and land.  Covered concrete pads can provide shelter for units training in the area who do not wish to deal with sleeping in the field.  The range control office as well as numerous semi-automated and other firing ranges are contained within this area as well.

East Range Training Area
The Air Assault School, Land Navigation Course, and designated training areas are laid out in this area to the east of the Main Post and the Enlisted Housing area.  Typically, the bulk of the EIB train up and testing are done in this area.

Kolekole Pass
Kolekole Road, which passes through the Enlisted Housing Area and West Post Training Area, leads up to a saddle named Kolekole Pass which allows vehicle traffic to flow between Schofield Barracks and Lualualei Naval Magazine as well as being an intermediate destination for physical training runs by soldiers stationed on Schofield Barracks.

A 37-foot, 35-ton steel cross located at Kolekole Pass was dismantled by the Army in 1997 after Hawaii Citizens for the Separation of State and Church filed a federal lawsuit charging the cross, built with public tax dollars in 1962, was a "blatant and obvious violation" of the First Amendment.

Education
Hawaii Department of Education operates two schools in Schofield Barracks CDP: Samuel K. Solomon Elementary School, and Daniel K. Inouye Elementary School.

Solomon Elementary's namesake was a member of the Wolfhounds. The dedication of the original campus was on November 11, 1969 while the dedication of the current facility occurred on November 9, 2019. In the 2016-2017 school year it had 933 students. The Department of Defense’s Office of Economic Adjustment funded the construction of the current campus with a $70,248,901. The State of Hawaii added an additional $20,000,000 to the funding. The current campus has four buildings, with each up to two stories tall, and a capacity of above 800. These buildings have 63 classrooms total.

Inouye Elementary opened in 1959 as Hale Kula Elementary School, and it was given its current name on April 19, 2016.

Sergeant Rodney J. T. Yano Library (Building 560), operated by the United States Army's Family and MWR Programs, is in the area. Hawaii State Public Library System operates nearby civilian public libraries.

25th Infantry Division Memorial
The 25th Infantry Division Memorial consists of four statues, representing the division's soldiers who served in World War II, Korea, Vietnam, and the War on Terrorism (Afghanistan and Iraq). The first statue was unveiled in June 2005, created by Artist Lynn Weiler Liverton

In popular culture
 Schofield Barracks was the principal setting for the novel From Here to Eternity (1951) by James Jones and the ensuing film of 1953, television mini-series (1979), and musical story (2003) versions.
 Schofield Barracks and its surrounding area were also used for CBS's Tour of Duty TV series.
 Schofield Barracks and its surrounding area were also used for the epic film about the Japanese attack on Pearl Harbor Tora! Tora! Tora! (1970), by 20th Century Fox.

See also
HABS/HAER documentation of Schofield Barracks at the Historic American Buildings Survey (HABS) and the Historic American Engineering Record (HAER)

References

External links

U.S. Army Garrison – Hawaii

Installations of the United States Army in Hawaii
Buildings and structures in Honolulu County, Hawaii
Barracks in the United States
Populated places on Oahu
Superfund sites in Hawaii
Military Superfund sites
Historic American Buildings Survey in Hawaii
Hawaii in World War II